Wave elections in the United States are elections in which a political party makes major gains. Based on the "red states and blue states" color coding convention since 2000, wave elections have often been described as either a "blue wave" if the Democratic Party makes significant gains, or a "red wave" if the Republican Party wins a substantial number of seats.

Wave elections usually happen during midterm elections. There is no consensus definition of what level of gains is necessary to constitute a wave election,
but the most recent election year widely described as a wave election was 2018's blue wave, where the Democratic Party regained control of the House of Representatives and made a net gain of 7 seats in gubernatorial elections.

Terminology
Political analyst Charlie Cook describes wave elections as the result of an "overarching, nationwide dynamic," such as a high or low presidential approval rating, economic conditions, and scandals. Cook contrasts wave elections with "micro-elections" in which neither party makes significant gains, and candidates, local issues, and other factors not strictly related to party alignment have a stronger role than in wave elections. Although several wave elections may occur in a row, wave elections are usually considered to be the exception rather than the norm. A pick-up of 20 seats in the United States House of Representatives has been used as a cut-off point by analysts such as Stuart Rothenberg. However, political scientist Dan Hopkins has argued that the term has little utility in understanding elections and that there is no clear cut-off point between a wave election and other elections.

Congressional incumbents in the United States enjoy an electoral advantage over challengers, but a wave election often boosts challengers, resulting in many more incumbents losing than usual during wave elections. A wave election can put into play seats that would otherwise be considered safe for the party holding the seat, and help even flawed challengers defeat incumbents. Since at least 1954, wave elections have always benefited one party at the expense of the other, but the term has also been used to describe a hypothetical scenario in which numerous incumbents from both parties lose their seats. The first election after redistricting is often a wave election, since many incumbents are less firmly rooted in their districts following redistricting, and many other incumbents retire or suffer primary defeats.

A wave election may also be concurrent with a landslide election, a term which usually refers to decisive victories in presidential contests. Many wave elections occur during midterm elections, with the party out of power picking up seats. A common pattern involves a party with a victorious presidential candidate benefiting from a wave election, followed by the opposing party winning a wave election in the next midterm election. Such occurred in 2008, with the election of Barack Obama as President, followed by the Republican wave of 2010.

See also
Coattail effect
Landslide victory
Party divisions of United States Congresses
Red states and blue states
Six-year itch

References

External links

Elections in the United States
Elections terminology
Political science terminology